Jonas Saeed, also known by his artist name KONO, is a Swedish record producer, DJ and Songwriter known for his work with producing and writing tracks for pop stars such as Jennifer Lopez, Kaskade, and Robin Thicke. Jonas Saeed notably co-wrote and produced Wisin & Yandel single "Follow the Leader", which topped charts around the world. Now based in Los Angeles, California, Saeed is self-releasing music under his alias KONO.

Discography

 

Discographies
Jonas Saeed at Allmusic
Jonas Saeed at Discogs

References

External links

Swedish songwriters
Swedish record producers
Living people
Year of birth missing (living people)